Henderson County is a county located in the U.S. state of Tennessee. As of the 2020 census, the population was 27,842. Its county seat is Lexington. The county was founded in 1821 and named for James Henderson, a soldier in the War of 1812.

History
Henderson County was established in 1821; it was named for Lt. Colonel James Henderson, Jr. (1775-1814), of the Tennessee State Militia, who was killed in late December 1814 below New Orleans during a clash with the British Army. Henderson is said to have served in earlier conflicts such as the Creek Indian war, which took place during the same overall time period as the War of 1812.

After the Battle of New Orleans, Major General William Carroll's Tennessee brigade, which was the largest single force under General Andrew Jackson's command in Louisiana, established their outgoing camp upriver from New Orleans and named it Camp Henderson.

General Carroll's first term as Governor of Tennessee began the same year that Henderson County was established.

The county seat, Lexington, was laid out in 1822.  Like many Tennessee counties, Henderson was divided during the Civil War.  Confederate sentiment was strongest in the western half of the county (where most of the county's plantations were located), while Union support was strongest in the hilly eastern half.

Geography

The county straddles the Tennessee Valley Divide, with waters east of the divide flowing into the Tennessee River, and waters west of the divide flowing into the Mississippi River.  Primary streams include the Beech River, which flows through the county's largest lake Beech Lake, and the Forked Deer River.

Adjacent counties
Carroll County (north)
Decatur County (east)
Hardin County (southeast)
Chester County (southwest)
Madison County (west)

State protected areas
Natchez Trace State Forest (part)
Natchez Trace State Park (part)

Climate and weather

The climate in Henderson County is characterized by relatively high temperatures and evenly distributed precipitation throughout the year. In summer, these regions are largely under the influence of moist, maritime airflow from the western side of the subtropical anticyclonic cells over low-latitude ocean waters. Temperatures are high and can lead to warm, oppressive nights. Summers are usually a bit drier than winters, with much of the rainfall coming from convectional thunderstorm activity; tropical cyclones may also enhance warm-season rainfall. The coldest month is usually quite mild, although freezes are not uncommon, and winter precipitation is derived primarily from frontal cyclones along the polar front.

The Köppen Climate Classification subtype for this climate is "Cfa". (Humid Subtropical Climate).

Major Highways

Demographics

2020 census

As of the 2020 United States census, there were 27,842 people, 10,711 households, and 7,113 families residing in the county.

2000 census
As of the census of 2000, there were 25,522 people, 10,306 households, and 7,451 families residing in the county.  The population density was 49 people per square mile (19/km2).  There were 11,446 housing units at an average density of 22 per square mile (8/km2).  The racial makeup of the county was 90.45% White, 8.00% Black or African American, 0.13% Native American, 0.14% Asian, 0.01% Pacific Islander, 0.33% from other races, and 0.94% from two or more races.  0.97% of the population were Hispanic or Latino of any race.

There were 10,306 households, out of which 32.30% had children under the age of 18 living with them, 56.90% were married couples living together, 11.70% had a female householder with no husband present, and 27.70% were non-families. 24.90% of all households were made up of individuals, and 10.70% had someone living alone who was 65 years of age or older.  The average household size was 2.44 and the average family size was 2.90.

In the county, the population was spread out, with 24.30% under the age of 18, 8.70% from 18 to 24, 28.80% from 25 to 44, 23.90% from 45 to 64, and 14.20% who were 65 years of age or older.  The median age was 37 years. For every 100 females there were 92.90 males.  For every 100 females age 18 and over, there were 90.00 males.

The median income for a household in the county was $32,057, and the median income for a family was $38,475. Males had a median income of $28,598 versus $21,791 for females. The per capita income for the county was $17,019.  About 9.20% of families and 12.40% of the population were below the poverty line, including 14.60% of those under age 18 and 14.50% of those age 65 or over.

Transportation
The Beech River Regional Airport is a public-use airport located five nautical miles northwest (5.8 mi, 9.3 km) northwest of the central business district of Parsons, a city in Decatur County. The airport is located in Darden, Tennessee.

Communities

City
Lexington (county seat)
Parkers Crossroads

Town
Sardis
Scotts Hill

Census-designated places
Chesterfield
Darden

Unincorporated communities

Cedar Grove
Crucifer
Huron
 Independence
 Juno
 Life
Luray
Middle Fork
 Mount Gilead
Reagan
Wildersville

Politics
Henderson County is overwhelmingly Republican, and, even before the rapid trend of the upland South away from the Democratic Party, was a Unionist Republican enclave in historically Democratic West Tennessee. This is due to the shallow, humus-poor and easily erodible Highland Rim soils, which were much less suitable for plantation farming than the rest of Middle and West Tennessee. Henderson County has not voted for a Democratic candidate since Samuel Tilden in the 1876 election, and the last time it didn't vote Republican was in 1912, when the county supported Progressive candidate Theodore Roosevelt; Henderson County was the only county in the state outside of East Tennessee for vote for Roosevelt in that election.

See also
National Register of Historic Places listings in Henderson County, Tennessee

References

External links

 Official site
 Henderson County Chamber of Commerce

 
1821 establishments in Tennessee
Populated places established in 1821
West Tennessee